Diving competitions at the 2015 Pan American Games in Toronto were held from July 10 to 13 at the Toronto Pan Am Sports Centre (CIBC Pan Am/Parapan Am Aquatics Centre and Field House). Due to naming rights the arena were known as the latter for the duration of the games. Due to Pan American Games being scheduled to be held roughly around the same time as the 2015 World Aquatics Championships scheduled for Kazan, Russia, the diving begin on the day of the opening ceremony (when events are traditionally not held on the day of the ceremony). A total of eight diving events were held: four each for men and women.

The winners of the four individual competitions, will qualify their country a quota place for the 2016 Summer Olympics in Rio de Janeiro, Brazil. If the host nation of the Olympics (Brazil) wins the event, the runner up will qualify instead.

Competition schedule

The following is the competition schedule for the diving competitions:

Medal table

Medalists

Men's events

Women's events

Qualification
A total of 60 divers qualified to compete at the games. Each nation might enter a team of up to eight divers (six if not competing in synchronized events). A maximum of two divers per country could be entered in the individual events, and one team in the synchronized events. Nations must submit the names of the divers they want entered by April 15, 2015. If the total number of divers exceeds 60, then Swimming Union of the Americas (UANA) will use the world rankings, and finishes in tournaments to determine the competing athletes.

Qualification summary/Participating countries

See also
Diving at the 2016 Summer Olympics

References

External link
Official Results Book

 
Events at the 2015 Pan American Games
Pan American Games
2015
Diving competitions in Canada